Tanaica Montes is a mountain range on the planet Mars. The name Tanaica Montes is a classical albedo name. This was approved by International Astronomical Union in 1991.

See also
 List of mountains on Mars

References

External links 
 Gazetteer of Planetary Nomenclature

Mountain ranges on Mars